Colfax Airport  is a public airport located in Colfax, a town in Grant Parish, Louisiana, United States. It is owned by the Town of Colfax.

Facilities and aircraft 
Colfax Airport covers an area of 200 acres (81 ha) which contains one runway designated 5/23 with a turf surface measuring 3,000 by 75 feet (914 x 23 m).

For the 12-month period ending April 3, 2007, the airport had 3,500 aircraft operations, an average of nine per day: 86% general aviation and 14% military.

See also 
 List of airports in Louisiana

References

External links 
 Aerial image as of January 1998 from USGS The National Map
 Aeronautical chart at SkyVector

Defunct airports in Louisiana
Airports in Louisiana
Transportation in Grant Parish, Louisiana
Buildings and structures in Grant Parish, Louisiana